Imperial Courts is a public housing project located in Watts, Los Angeles, California.

It is located at 11541 Croesus Avenue on Imperial Highway, between Grape Street and Mona Boulevard, near I-105 Freeway. The federally subsidized project of 498 units was completed in May 1944. It is operated by the Housing Authority of the City of Los Angeles. The project is predominantly inhabited by persons of African-American  and Mexican descent, who in 1991 constituted 88 percent of the population. It is one of the largest housing projects west of the Mississippi.

Emergency services

Police service
The Los Angeles Police Department operates the nearby Southeast Community Police Station. This location resulted in a general reduction in crime in comparison to the 1990s, although the area still has a homicide rate 57% higher than the Los Angeles County average. On October 26, 2014, five people were shot in the complex, including one woman who was killed, in separate incidents.

Education
Imperial Courts is zoned to:
 Grape Elementary School
 Markham Middle School
 Jordan High School.

All three are in the Los Angeles Unified School District.

Notable events
TEDxWatts was hosted in Watts on March 11, 2017, by organizer Justin Mayo.

The project is the subject of a 22-year documentary project called Imperial Courts by Dutch photographer Dana Lixenburg.

The P Jay Crips were founded at this project.

Parts of the motion picture Training Day were filmed in Imperial Courts to give the movie a true-to-life project setting.

The movie Imperial Dreams starring John Boyega was shot in Imperial Courts. Imperial Court is the real-life home of Bobby Yay Yay Jones, whom the film is centered around.

The video of "Cool Like Me" by Fryar was also shot in Imperial Courts.

References

External links
 Google satellite map

Public housing in Los Angeles
Residential buildings completed in 1944
Watts, Los Angeles